Maria Catrinel Folea is a former international table tennis player from Romania.

Table tennis career
She won a bronze medal at the 1961 World Table Tennis Championships, in the Corbillon Cup (women's team event) for Romania with Maria Alexandru and Georgita Pitica.

See also
 List of World Table Tennis Championships medalists

References

Romanian female table tennis players
Year of birth missing (living people)
World Table Tennis Championships medalists
Possibly living people